Luca Antignani (born 1976 in Italy) is an Italian composer of contemporary classical music. He is also an academic, teaching in Switzerland and France.

Life 
Luca Antignani is graduated in piano, orchestral conducting, electronic music and composition at the Scuola Civica "Claudio Abbado" in Milan, at the Accademia Nazionale of Santa Cecilia in Rome and at the IRCAM in Paris. His pieces had been committed by prestigious institutions and performed in several international music festivals as the Biennale (Venice), Teatro dell’Opera, MiTo, Accademia Nazionale di Santa Cecilia (Rome), Nouvel Ensemble Moderne (Montréal), Opéra Comique, Radio France, Présences, Résonances and Agora (Paris), Orchestra della RAI (Turin), Orchestre des Pays de Savoie (Annecy), Opéra, Orchestre National, Société de Musique de Chambre, Festival Biennale en Musiques, Ensemble Orchestral Contemporain and Chœur Britten (Lyon), Musica (Strasbourg), Les Musiques, Orchestre des Jeunes de la Méditerranée (Marseille), Dresdner Musikfestspiele (Dresde) and several city as San Francisco, Philadelphia, Bloomington, Ithaca (USA), Tallinn (Estonia) and Rostock (Germany). His works have been broadcast and telecast by RAI and by a lot of national radios (like Radio France and Radio Canada).

Actually he teaches orchestration at the CNSMD of Lyon (France) and contemporary music and orchestration at the HEM of Lausanne (Suisse). His scores are edited by Edizioni Suvini Zerboni (Milano).

Honors and awards 

 Winner of the international composition competition GRAME / EOC of Lyon (France) (2008)
 3rd prize in the international composition competition Molinari of Montréal (Canada) (2006)
 Winner of the international composition competition Barlow Prize (USA) (2005)
 2nd prize in the international composition competition Méditerranéen Music Centre of Lamia (Greece) (2004)
 1st prize in the international composition competition Città di Como (Italy) (2003)
 1st prize in the international composition competition Fattoria Paradiso (Italy) (2002)
 2nd prize (1st prize not assigned) in the international composition competition Guido d’Arezzo (Italy) (2001)

Works 
Selected works include:

 Azulejos (2014) for harp
 Il canto della pietra (2004) for cello    
 Reiten, reiten, reiten (2004) for guitar
 Overlook Hotel (2002) for accordion and live electronics        
 The icy light of the moon (1998) for piano  
 Là et ailleurs  (2003) for choir and orchestra
 Und dieses einen Weges kamen sie (1998) for guitar
 Un regard dans l’onde (2013-2014) for soprano, flute and accordion
 As the fainting Bee (2014) for soprano, violin, viola and cello
 Batte botte (2013) for children (or women) choir
 Litanie briganti (2015) for flute, oboe, clarinet, basson, horn, trumpet, trombone and piano    
 Trio del sogno e del gabbiano (2014) for violin, cello and piano        
 Etude sur "La vie" (2012) for cimbalom, flute, clarinet, violin, viola and cello
 Nix et nox (2012) for flute, clarinet, violin and cello
 Il re della foresta (2008) for string quartet
 Il Giuoco delle perle di vetro (2006) for 2 flutes, 2 Oboes, 2 Clarinets, horn, trumpet, trombone, tuba, 2 percussions, harp, piano, 2 violins, 2 viole, cello and double bass

Discography 
Selected recordings include:

 Frasi nella luce nascente on Ema, Vinci
 Azulejos on Continuo Classics
 Forum 2000/2002  on Atma
 Voix de Strass
 Concourse Molinari 2005/2006

References

External links 
Official page

Living people
1976 births
21st-century Italian composers
21st-century classical composers